was a town located in Miyaki District, Saga Prefecture, Japan. The status of Nakabaru was changed from a village to a town on April 1, 1971.

As of 2003, the town had an estimated population of 8,829 and a density of 467.14 persons per km2. The total area was 18.90 km2.

On March 1, 2005, Nakabaru, along with the towns of Kitashigeyasu and Mine (all from Miyaki District), was merged to create the town of Miyaki.

Dissolved municipalities of Saga Prefecture